is a former Japanese football player for Yokohama FC.

Playing career
Katsuya Iwatake played for the J2 League club Oita Trinita in 2014.

Club statistics
Last Update:20 February 2019

References

External links

1996 births
Living people
Association football people from Ōita Prefecture
Japanese footballers
J1 League players
J2 League players
Oita Trinita players
Urawa Red Diamonds players
Yokohama FC players
Association football defenders